Tunefind is an American music search website which helps to find music featured in television series and movies.

Users can suggest songs related to TV show or movie. If approved, song will be listed on that page. The songs' accuracy depends on votes given by the users.

It was founded in 2005 and is based in San Francisco Bay Area, California, United States.

References

American music websites
Music search engines
Android (operating system) software
IOS software
Companies based in San Francisco
Internet properties established in 2005